The ACHPR Tigray investigation is an African Commission on Human and Peoples' Rights (ACHPR) investigation of human rights violations occurring in the Tigray War including extrajudicial executions of civilians and sexual violence. The ACHPR established the Commission of Inquiry into the situation in the Tigray Region to carry out the investigation under ACHPR resolution 482 of 12 May 2021.

Creation
The ACHPR decided to create a commission to investigate gross human rights violations occurring in the Tigray War in resolution 482 on 12 May 2021, referring to Ethiopia's obligations under articles 45(2) and 46 of the African Charter on Human and Peoples' Rights, principles of non-interference, existing documentation on the human rights violations of the war, and other investigations such as the EHRC–OHCHR Tigray investigation. The Commission of Inquiry into the situation in the Tigray Region was established for a renewable period of three months, with a mandate to investigate gross human rights violations, including extrajudicial executions of civilians and sexual violence, by collecting evidence, identifying perpetrators, determining the underlying causes, and reporting results and making recommendations to prevent patterns of human rights violations from continuing. In August 2021, the Commission was renewed for another three months.

Location
The Commission's headquarters are in Banjul, with the aim of travelling to Ethiopia and "neighbouring countries when conditions are met".

Leadership and structure
Rémy Ngoy Lumbu, vice-chair of the ACHPR, is the chair of the Commission. The four other members initially included in the Commission are Maya Sahli-Fadel, Hatem Essaiem, Maria Teresa Manuela and Mudford Zachariah Mwandenga.

The Commission has the right to co-opt forensic investigation, human rights or other experts as additional members. In August 2021, human rights experts Fatsah Ouguergouz, Soyata Maïga and Lucy Asuagbor were retrospectively appointed as of June 2021.

Report
In September 2021, Commission chair Rémy Ngoy Lumbu stated that the Commission's report would be published by the end of 2021.

See also
EHRC–OHCHR Tigray investigation

References

External links

Tigray War
Human rights in Ethiopia